Araeophylla is a genus of moth in the family Gelechiidae.

Species
 Araeophylla flavigutella (Bruand, [1851])
 Araeophylla lachtensis (Erschoff, [1877])
 Araeophylla languidella (Amsel, 1936)
 Araeophylla natrixella (Weber, 1945)
 Araeophylla spiladias (Meyrick, 1921)

References

 
Gelechiinae
Moth genera